ATR may refer to:

Medicine
 Acute transfusion reaction
 Ataxia telangiectasia and Rad3 related, a protein involved in DNA damage repair

Science and mathematics
 Advanced Test Reactor, nuclear research reactor at the Idaho National Laboratory, US
 Attenuated total reflectance in infrared spectroscopy
 Advanced tongue root, a phonological feature in linguistics
 Atractyloside, a toxin and inhibitor of "ADP/ATP translocase"
 ATR0, an axiom system in reverse mathematics

Technology
 Answer to reset, a message output by a contact Smart Card
 Automatic target recognition, recognition ability
 Autothermal reforming, a natural gas reforming technology

Transport
 ATR (aircraft manufacturer) an Italian-French aircraft manufacturer
 ATR 42 airliner
 ATR 72 airliner
 IATA code for Atar International Airport
Andaman Trunk Road
 Air Transport Rack, standards for plug-in electronic modules in aviation and elsewhere; various suppliers e.g. ARINC
 Atmore (Amtrak station), Amtrak station code ATR

Music
 All That Remains (band), an American heavy metal band
 Atari Teenage Riot, a German techno band performing "digital hardcore" music
 ATR (song), a song by ATR

Organisations
 Absent Teacher Reserve, of teachers in New York City
 Americans for Tax Reform
 Anglican Theological Review

Other
 African Traditional Religion
 ATR: All Terrain Racing, a video game
 ATR.1 certificate, in trade between EU and Turkey
 ATR (company) (Auto-Teile-Ring), Germany
 Average True Range, a market volatility indicator
 ATR (TV channel), a Crimean Tatar TV Channel in Ukraine